Bjarke Møller (born September 23, 1985) is a Danish professional ice hockey player who is currently playing for the AaB Ishockey of the AL-Bank Ligaen. Møller competed in several Junior World Cup events including 2003, 2005, 2005, and also the 2012 IIHF World Championship as a member of the Denmark men's national ice hockey team.

Career statistics

References

External links

1985 births
Living people
Danish ice hockey defencemen
Sportspeople from Aalborg